Brandon Jamal Bostick (born May 3, 1989) is a former American football tight end. He played college football at Newberry. Bostick was signed by the Green Bay Packers as an undrafted free agent in 2012. He was also member of the Minnesota Vikings, Arizona Cardinals and New York Jets.

Early life and college career
Bostick was born in Florence, South Carolina and graduated from West Florence High School in 2007. He then attended Newberry College, a Division II school. After redshirting his freshman year, Bostick played at Newberry as wide receiver from the 2008 to 2011 seasons. In 39 games, he started 24 and made 136 receptions for 1,935 yards and 19 touchdowns. Bostick also played basketball at Newberry for the second half of his junior season. He was a sports management major at Newberry.

Professional career

Green Bay Packers

He was signed by the Packers as an undrafted free agent on May 30, 2012. Bostick spent his entire rookie season in 2012 on the practice squad.

Playing primarily on special teams, Bostick made his NFL debut on September 15, 2013 against Washington. He recorded his first NFL touchdown catch on November 10, 2013 against the Philadelphia Eagles, on a 22-yard pass from Scott Tolzien, in a play that was also Tolzien's first career touchdown pass. Bostick finished the 2013 season with 7 receptions for 120 yards and a touchdown in 11 games. He missed the Thanksgiving Classic due to a concussion suffered during the November 24 game.  On December 15 against Dallas, Bostick suffered a foot injury late in the second half; he was placed on season-ending injured reserve six days later.

Bostick played 13 games in the 2014 season and made 2 receptions for 3 yards and a touchdown. On November 9, in a Sunday night 55-14 win over the Chicago Bears, Bostick made the Packers' first touchdown score, on a pass from Aaron Rodgers on fourth down from the Bears' 1-yard line.

In the NFC Championship Game against the Seattle Seahawks on January 18, 2015, with slightly over 2 minutes remaining and the Packers leading 19–14, Bostick, the Packers' third-string tight end, misplayed a Seahawks onside kick by ignoring his blocking assignment and stepping in front of All-Pro receiver Jordy Nelson who was assigned to catch and was waiting for the ball. The ball bounced off Bostick's helmet and was recovered by Seahawks wide receiver Chris Matthews. In the ensuing drive, the Seahawks scored a touchdown and two-point conversion to go ahead 22–19. Mason Crosby made a game-tying field goal with 14 seconds left, but Seattle won 28–22 in overtime. Bostick was widely credited in both Wisconsin and National sports media as having made a Bill Buckner type mistake costing his team a chance for a championship. In his postgame interview, Bostick acknowledged that he was supposed to block so that Jordy Nelson could recover the onside kick. Bostick was released on February 16, 2015.

Minnesota Vikings
Bostick was claimed off waivers by the Minnesota Vikings on February 18, 2015. He was released as part of the first wave of roster cuts on August 30, 2015.

Arizona Cardinals
On September 7, 2015, the Arizona Cardinals signed Bostick to their practice squad. On September 22, 2015, he was released by the Cardinals. On October 2, 2015, Bostick was re-signed to the Cardinals' practice squad. On December 1, 2015, he was released from practice squad.

New York Jets
On December 8, 2015, the New York Jets signed Bostick to their practice squad. In 2016 he played in 16 games, starting in 7 of them, finishing the season with 8 catches for 63 yards.

Statistics
Source: NFL.com

Personal life
His cousin, Akeem Bostick, is a Major League Baseball player.

References

External links
Green Bay Packers bio

1989 births
Living people
Players of American football from South Carolina
Sportspeople from Florence, South Carolina
American football tight ends
Newberry Wolves football players
Newberry Wolves men's basketball players
Green Bay Packers players
Minnesota Vikings players
Arizona Cardinals players
New York Jets players